The armatoles, or armatole in singular, were Christian irregular soldiers, or militia, commissioned by the Ottomans to enforce the Sultan's authority within an administrative district called an Armatoliki ( in singular,  in plural). In Greek regions of the Ottoman Empire, they were composed of Greeks who were either former klephts or village stalwarts who had taken up arms against the klephts in the defense of their district.

The Greek armatoles had a semi-independent status all over the Greek peninsula, and armatolikia were created in areas that had high levels of brigandage (i.e. klephts), or in regions that were difficult for Ottoman authorities to govern due to the inaccessible terrain, such as the Agrafa mountains of Thessaly, where the first armatoliki was established in the 15th century. Over time, the roles of the armatoles and klephtes became blurred, with both reversing their roles and allegiances as the situation demanded, all the while maintaining the delicate status-quo with the Ottoman authorities. They were armed men who were enforcing the law according to their desires with the force of their guns, armata, since the authority of the Ottoman Empire was very limited in the areas that they were acting, as the Ottoman Empire where the armatoles were present was a failed state.

During the Greek War of Independence, the Greek armatoles, along with the klephts, formed the nucleus of the Greek fighting forces, and played a prominent part throughout its duration. Yannis Makriyannis referred to them and klephts as the "yeast of liberty" (μαγιά της λευτεριάς). Despite being ineffective, they were the only viable military force for the provisional governments of the 1821-1827 period. During that time period, three attempts were made at creating a regular army, and one of the reasons for their failure was the resistance of the klepht and armatoles leaders. Their motive to fight the Ottomans was more personal gain than national aspirations; they were not aware of national projects, made alliances with the Ottomans and robbed Christians as much as Muslims. 

There were also some Albanian and Bosnian armatoles, who were drawn from the local Muslim populations, as well as some Aromanian armatoles, many of whom cooperated with pro-Bulgarian komitadjis. There also were Megleno-Romanian armatoles.

Etymology
The word "armatole" first appeared in the 15th century during Venetian times. It is derived from a medieval loan from Latin arma ('weapon'), probably via Greek αρματολόγος ('someone who deals with arms', 'an armed person') → αρματολόος → αρματολός. According to an older hypothesis, the development of the word may also have been influenced by a conflation with the similar-sounding αμαρτωλός ("sinner"; cf. hamartia), which may have been associated with the topic of armed bands through phrases such as "αμαρτωλοί/αρματολοί και κλέφτες" (meaning "sinners and thieves", but also "armatoles and klephts"). Owing to the parallelism with "αμαρτωλός", the word was also sometimes spelled as "αρματωλός", with the letter omega.

Origins and structure

The military/police organization of the armatoles, known as armatolismos, has its origins in the Byzantine period of Greek history. Armatolismos was a type of feudalism where police and military functions were provided in exchange for titles of land. As an institution, the armatoles first appear in Agrafa, Thessaly during the reign of Sultan Murad II (r. 1421–1451). From there, they spread to other parts of Greece except the Peloponnese.

Administrative districts known as armatolikia were created in areas of Greece that had high levels of brigandage (i.e. klephts), or in regions that were difficult for Ottoman authorities to govern due to the inaccessible terrain. An armatoliki was commanded by a kapetanios  often a former klepht captain who had been hired by the governing Ottoman pasha to combat, or at least contain, brigand groups operating in the region. In most cases, the captain would have gained a level of notoriety as a klepht to force the Ottomans to give him amnesty and the privileges that came with an armatoliki. Therefore, it was not surprising that armatole units were organised in very much the same way as the klephts, with a captain assisted by a lieutenant called a protopalikaro, who was usually a kinsman, and the remaining force made up of armatoles. Many captains ran their armatolikia like their personal fiefdoms, exacting a heavy toll of extortion and violence on the local peasantry.

Greek armatoles

As mentioned earlier, the armatoles were organized based on a feudal system under which they maintained their military/police duties in exchange for titles of land. When the Ottomans conquered Greece in the 15th century, they established treaties with the armatoles in order for them to maintain their military/police functions. The Ottomans would have units of armatoles or kapetanioi (καπετάνιοι, captains) function as peace-keepers in territories near difficult terrain (i.e. mountain passes) or in areas where resistance to foreign rule entailed acts of theft by the klephts. Most armatoles were former klephts who had received amnesty. They were chosen with agreement between the local pasha and Muslim and Christian community representatives (local primates). They were paid by the local people, and made use of force to collect taxes. This caused conflicts between the armatoles and community representatives. There were also instances of collaboration between them to exterminate rival factions.

The armatoles were mostly concentrated in Macedonia, Thessaly, Epirus, Acarnania, and Aetolia (specifically Agrafa). In the Peloponnese, armatolismos did not develop in the same manner as it did in Roumeli and Epirus. In the Peloponnese, the kapoi (κάποι) and the meintanides (μεϊντάνηδες) were similar to the armatoles. If in certain regions, the institution of armatolismos was not implemented, the territories were divided into armatolikia (αρματολίκια) or protakta (προτάκτα). These territories extended from the Axios River (Αξιός) to the Ambracian Gulf (Αμβρακικός) and up to the Corinthian Gulf (Κορινθιακός). The kapetanioi would often have authority over these territories via inheritance/succession. A single kapetanio was at first forced to submit his authority to the pasha who controlled the periphery. Later, all kapetanioi were forced to submit to Dervedji pasha (Δερβετζή πασά).

During the 18th century, there were around seventeen armatolikia. Ten of them were located in Thessaly and the eastern regions of Central Greece, four of them in Epirus, Acarnania, and Aetolia, and three in Macedonia. Every kapetanio had his rank-and-file soldiers known as palikaria (παλικάρια, from ancient Greek pallix) and section leaders among these palikaria were known as protopalikara (πρωτοπαλίκαρα). The palikaria would train with their weapons on a daily basis.

The main weapon the palikaria utilized was the kariofili (καριοφίλι). Marksmanship was the proverbial hallmark that defined the palikaria. They were also highly mobile and capable at conducting ambushes. The palikaria were resilient toward thirst, hunger and even the painful difficulties in their encounters with the klephts.

The term klephtopolemos (κλεφτοπόλεμος) was used to name the strategies/tactics that both the klephts and armatoles utilized. These tactics are used today for unconventional military campaigns by small guerrilla groups. The armatoles would conduct campaigns during nighttime. This strategy was known as "going out to pagana" (έβγαιναν στην παγάνα). The armatoles would usually do this when the klephts were coming out of their dens. The armatoles would defend themselves in improvised forts (called meterizia; μετερίζια) against the guerrilla tactics utilized by the klephts (specifically known as klephtouria; κλεφτουριά). A general offensive campaign by the armatoles was known as giourousi (γιουρούσι). During one of these campaigns, the armatoles would make effective use of swords and war cries.

Greek War of Independence 
During the 1810-1820 decade the Greek armatoles largely depended on the support they enjoyed from Ali Pasha. Because of that they had little influence from the Greek nationalist organization Filiki Eteria and had reservations about participating at the Greek War of Independence. This changed after Ali Pasha died and their future became less certain. The klephts and armatoles played a key role during the Greek War of Independence. Despite being ineffective, they were the only viable military force for the provisional governments of the 1821-1827 period. During that time period, three attempts were made at creating a  regular army, and one the reasons for their failure was the resistance of the klepht and armatoles leaders. Among armatoles leaders were Odysseas Androutsos, Georgios Karaiskakis, Athanasios Diakos, Markos Botsaris and Giannis Stathas. Contrary to conventional Greek history, many of the klephts and armatoles participated at the Greek War of Independence according to their own militaristic patron-client terms. They saw the war as an economic and political opportunity to expand their areas of operation. Balkan bandits such as the klephts and armatoles - glorified in nationalist historiography as national heroes - were actually driven by economic interests, were not aware of national projects, made alliances with the Ottomans and robbed Christians as much as Muslims.

Other armatoles

Aromanian armatoles 

There also were ethnic Aromanian armatole fighters. Many of these often engaged in cooperation with pro-Bulgarian komitadjis such as the Secret Macedo-Adrianopolitan Revolutionary Organization (TMORO).

Albanian armatoles 
There were also Albanian armatoles. During the Austro-Turkish War (1716–1718), an Albanian armatole-like private militia caused trouble in Kavala, resulting in its abolition by Ahmed III in 1721; however, it continued to exist illegally for another 100 years.

Bosnian armatoles 
In Bosnia, armatoles were largely drawn from the local Muslim populations. According to documents, in 1485-1490 these Bosnian armatoles were tasked with guarding the Turkish forts on the shores of Dalmatia which sustained attacks from the Venetians.

Megleno-Romanian armatoles 
Traian Cucuda, a Megleno-Romanian, was a relevant armatole captain at his time.

Famous armatoles

Aromanians
There were several Aromanian armatoles, including:

 Mihail Handuri
 Gheorghe Mucitani
 Cola Nicea
 Giorgakis Olympios

Greeks
Athanasios Diakos
Georgios Karaiskakis
Odysseas Androutsos
Giannis Stathas

References

Citations

Sources

Further reading

Ottoman Greece
Military units and formations of the Ottoman Empire
Militias in Europe
History of the Aromanians
History of the Megleno-Romanians